Billygoat plum is a common name for several plants and may refer to:

Planchonia careya
Terminalia ferdinandiana, native to Australia
Terminalia petiolaris